"Look What You Made Me Do" is a song released in August 2017 by Taylor Swift. It may also refer to:

Music

"Look What You Made Me Do", track from the 1968 album I've Been Doin' Some Thinkin' by American pianist and singer Mose Allison
"Look What You Made Me Do", track from the 1997 album How Ace Are Buildings by British alt rock band
"Look What You Made Me Do", a song on the June 2017 mixtape 508-507-2209 by Joyner Lucas

 Look What You Made Me Do, a 2017 EP by all-female Portuguese punk rock band Anarchicks

Other uses
 Look What You Made Me Do, a 2011 exhibition by Australian artist Luke Cornish

 Look What You Made Me Do, a 2017 show by Australian comedian Demi Lardner Look What You Made Me Do, a personal substack of Eugene S. Robinson, vocalist for the US band Oxbow

See also

 Now Look What You Made Me Do, 1997 film written by Canadian screenwriter Marie ClementsSee What You Made Me Do'', 2019 book by Australian writer Jess Hill, and 2021 TV series on which it is based